Abismo e Carnaval (Portuguese for "Abyss and Carnival") is the tenth studio album by the Brazilian musician Rogério Skylab; the first installment of what he calls the "Trilogia dos Carnavais" (Trilogy of the Carnivals). It was self-released in 2012. Contrasting with the rock-influenced sonority of Skylab's previous releases, the three albums of the Trilogia dos Carnavais head towards a softer, less experimental direction inspired by Brazilian traditional genres, such as samba, bossa nova and MPB, and by the Tropicalista movement.

MPB pioneer Jorge Mautner was a guest musician on the album; he co-wrote and provided additional vocals for the track "Palmeira Brasileira".

The album can be downloaded for free on Skylab's official website.

Critical reception
The album has received positive reviews upon its release; writing for Território da Música, Edi Fortini gave it 3 stars out of 5, commenting that "it may sound a little weird at first if you're used to Skylab's previous releases", but "this estrangement gradually fades away" and that, "in the end, the musician achieves the perfect union between rhythm and lyrics". She particularly praised the tracks "Um Acorde Imperfeito", "Só", "Eu Sou uma Pedra" and "Equivocidade".

Track listing

Personnel
 Rogério Skylab – vocals, production
 Luizinho Dias – soprano sax, tenor sax
 Chico Dafé – drums, percussion
 Lúcio Dário – bass guitar
 Conjunto Camerato – string sextet
 Jorge Mautner – additional vocals (track 4)
 Luiz Antônio Gomes – mixing, mastering
 Solange Venturi – cover art

References

2012 albums
Rogério Skylab albums
Self-released albums
Obscenity controversies in music
Albums free for download by copyright owner